Benta is a state constituency in Pahang, Malaysia, that has been represented in the Pahang State Legislative Assembly.

Demographics

History

Polling districts 
According to the federal gazette issued on 31 October 2022, the Lipis constituency is divided into 42 polling districts.

Representation history

Election results

References 

Pahang state constituencies